National Youth Administration Woodstock Resident Work Center is a national historic district located at Woodstock in Ulster County, New York.  The district includes seven contributing buildings and three contributing structures. It includes three shop buildings, four shed buildings, a ca. 1900 barn, and a decorative flagpole base.  It was built in 1939 by the National Youth Administration and operated until 1942 as a facility devoted to training youths in the industrial arts.  The camp is currently used by the Woodstock School of Art.

It was listed on the National Register of Historic Places in 1992.

References

National Register of Historic Places in Ulster County, New York
Historic districts on the National Register of Historic Places in New York (state)
Historic districts in Ulster County, New York
National Youth Administration
Buildings and structures completed in 1939